The Katō Tomosaburō Cabinet is the 21st Cabinet of Japan led by Katō Tomosaburō from June 12, 1922 to August 24, 1923.

Cabinet 

Following Katō's death on August 24, 1923, Uchida Kōsai served as acting Prime Minister from August 24 to September 2, 1923.

References 

Cabinet of Japan
1922 establishments in Japan
Cabinets established in 1922
Cabinets disestablished in 1923